Haanii Shivraj was a Malaysian actress and model from the Malaysian Indian origin. She is well known for having acted in the blockbuster Kollywood movie, Biriyani. Beside that she also well known for her acting in Malaysian Tamil language local movie, Appalam

Career and personal life
Shivraj began her career as an actress and a television anchor in 2010. Prior to becoming an actress, she worked as a flight stewardess.

Shivrasj died from cancer on 13 April 2015 at the age of 29.

Selected filmography
Below are the selected filmography of Haanii Sivaraj :
 2011 - Appalam 
 2011 - Pak Kaduk- Malay Language Drama
 2013 - Biriyani-Indian Movie
 2013 - Arrambam-Indian Movie
 2013 - Anushthaana

References

1976 births
2015 deaths
Malaysian film actresses
Malaysian female models
Malaysian people of Indian descent
Malaysian people of Tamil descent
Deaths from cancer in Malaysia
Flight attendants
Malaysian expatriate actresses in India
Actresses in Tamil cinema
21st-century Malaysian actresses